Korea Electric Power Corporation, better known as KEPCO (Hangul: 켑코) or Hanjeon (Hangul: 한전),  is the largest electric utility in South Korea,
responsible for the generation, transmission and distribution of electricity and the development of electric power projects including those in nuclear power, wind power and coal. KEPCO, through its subsidiaries, is responsible for 93% of Korea's electricity generation as of 2011. The South Korean government (directly and indirectly) owns a 51.11% share of KEPCO. Together with its affiliates and subsidiaries, KEPCO has an installed capacity of 65,383 MW. On the 2011 Fortune Global 500 ranking of the world's largest companies, KEPCO was ranked 271. KEPCO is a member of the World Energy Council, the World Nuclear Association and the World Association of Nuclear Operators. As of August 2011, KEPCO possesses an A+ credit rating with Fitch Ratings, while Moody's has assigned KEPCO an A1 stable rating.

Originally located in Samseong-dong, Seoul, KEPCO headquarters was relocated to the city of Naju in South Jeolla Province in August 2014 as part of a government decentralization program. The move, which has been in the works for years has been controversial. Jong-Kap Kim is the president and CEO of KEPCO.

History 

KEPCO traces its origins to Hanseong Jeongi Hoesa (Seoul Electric Company), founded in 1898 during Imperial Korea. The announcement of the Chōsen Electricity Control Decree by the Colonial Korean government in March 1943 saw the integration of several electric companies into the Korea Electric Power Company. The Korea Electric Company (KECO), established through the integration of the Korea Electric Power Company and two distribution companies, Gyeongsung Electric Company and South Korea Electric Company, opened on 1 July 1961. In 1982, KECO became a wholly government owned entity and was renamed the Korea Electric Power Corporation (KEPCO).

KEPCO was listed on the Korea Stock Exchange on 10 August 1989 and later in 1994 on the New York Stock Exchange. In 1996, KEPCO was named the prime contractor for the multinational Korean Peninsula Energy Development Organization (KEDO) project to construct a light water reactor nuclear power plant in North Korea, a project which was eventually abandoned in 2006. Following a push by the Korean government to restructure Korea's power industry which began in the mid-1990s, the Act on the Promotion of Restructuring the Electric Power Industry was proclaimed on 23 December 2000, after which the electricity generation business was split up into Korea Hydro & Nuclear Power, a subsidiary responsible for nuclear & hydro power generation, and five thermal power generation companies: Korea South-East Power, Korea Midland Power, Korea Western Power, Korea Southern Power, and Korea East-West Power.

In October 2012, Korea Deposit Insurance Corporation sold its 3.6% of its stake in KEPCO for a fee of around $550 million.

Timeline 

 March 1887 – Turned the first electric lights on (Geongchung Palace inside Gyeongbok Palace)
 January 1898 – Founded Hansung Electric Company
 April 1900 – Lighted three streetlamps  in Jongno by Hansung Electric Company (first-ever lighting in public area)
 March 1944 – Completed Supung Hydro Power Plant (600,000 kW)
 July 1961 – Established Korea Electric Power Company with Electricity Enterprises Act (three electric companies were merged)
 April 1964 – Cleared limited electric power transmission for the first time since national liberation
 December 1965 – Declared Act on the Promotion of Electrification in Agricultural and Fishing Villages
 May 1968 – Exceeded one million kW in electric power generation capacity
 April 1978 – Completed 1st unit of Kori Nuclear Power Plant (587,000 kW)
 January 1982 – Launched Korea Electric Power Corporation
 August 1989 – Listed on the Korea Stock Exchange as people's share No.2
 October 1994 – Listed on the New York Stock Exchange for the first time 
 February 1995 – Won bid to operate Malaya power plant in the Philippines
 August 1997 – Broke ground for KEDO nuclear power plant construction
 July 2000 – Exceeded 40 million kW in maximum demand electric power
 April 2001 – Spun the business off into six power generation subsidiaries
 June 2002 – Completed Ilijan Gas combined cycle power plant, the largest in the Philippines
 November 2005 – Increased voltage to 220 V for distribution line, and commenced electric power supply to Gaesung Industrial Complex
 June 2006 – Awarded Edison Award
 September 2006 – Launched independent project division
 December 2009 – Exported nuclear power plant to overseas for the first time (UAE)
 December 2011 – Selected as corrupt-free institute for six years in a row in anti-corruption evaluation, and ranked first in customer satisfaction for 13 years in a row
 February 2012 – Completed Al Qatrana power plant in Jordan
 December 2012 – Ranked first in the public sector for 14 years in a row
 October 2013 – Hosted the World Energy Council, the world's largest and most influential energy event, in Daegu
 December 2014 – Relocated to Bitgaram Innovation City, opening the Energy Valley Era
 October 2015 – Successfully held Bitgaram International Exposition on Electric Power Technology (BIXPO 2015)
 May 2016 – Selected as the top electric utility in the 2016 Platts
 August 2016 – Won a 2016 CIO 100 Award, a first for a Korean company
 October 2016 – Signed a joint venture agreement for the operation of the UAE power plant

Subsidiaries 
KEPCO comprises six power generation companies and four subsidiaries in related business areas. It also owns a stake in four affiliated companies.

Power generation companies
 Korea Hydro & Nuclear Power (KHNP): operates 21 nuclear power plants and 27 hydropower plants in Korea which account for 18,265 MW in total capacity (as of Dec. 2010).
 Korea South-East Power (KOEN): with 8,976 MW in total capacity (as of Dec. 2010), KOSEP operates the Samcheonpo Thermal Power Site Division and the Yeongheung Thermal Power Plant.
 Korea Midland Power (KOMIPO): operates the Boryeong Thermalelectric Power Plant Site Division and the Yeongheung Thermal Power Plant, and possesses 9,399 MW in total installed capacity (as of Dec. 2010).
 Korea Western Power: operates the Taean Thermal Power Plant and manages a total installed capacity of 9,604 MW via 8 soft coal-fired units, 24 LNG combined cycle units, 4 oil-fired units and 4 pumped storage power plant units.
 Korea Southern Power (KOSPO): operates the Hadong Thermal Power Site Division and manages 9,638 MW in total installed capacity as of Dec. 2010.
 Korea East-West Power: operates the Dangjin and Honam Coal Fired Power Plants, and manages a total of 9,510 MW in installed capacity as of Dec. 2010.

Other subsidiaries

 KEPCO E&C: KEPCO Engineering & Construction (KEPCO E&C) is a comprehensive engineering company which develops and designs nuclear and thermal power plants. KEPCO owns a 77.94% share of KEPCO E&C.
 KEPCO Nuclear Fuel (KNF): KEPCO Nuclear Fuel specializes in the design and manufacture of nuclear fuel, as well as fuel engineering services. KNF is the world's only producer of nuclear fuel for both light-water (LWR) and heavy water (HWR) reactors. KEPCO's share of KNF stands at 96.4%.
 Korea Plant Service & Engineering: Korea Plant Service & Engineering is 75% owned by KEPCO. It provides maintenance services for Korea's power generation, transmission, transformation and industrial facilities.
 Korea Electric Power Data Network: 100% wholly owned by KEPCO, Korea Electric Power Data Network provides IT services covering the full range of electric power from generation and transmission to distribution and sales.

Affiliated companies
Korea Electric Power Industrial Development Corporation
Korea Gas Corporation
Korea District Heating Corporation
LG UPlus Corporation

Overseas office 

 Abu Dhabi Branch Office - Muroor Road(4th st), al Mamoura, B Po Box 112010, Abu Dhabi, UAE
 KEPCO China Office - 2702, Tower A, Tianyuangang Center No.C2, Dongsanhuanbeilu, Chaoyang District, Beijing, 100027, China
 KEPCO New York Office - 400 Kelby Street, Parker Plaza 7th Floor, Fort Lee, NJ 07024, U.S.A
 KEPCO Tokyo Office - 3rd Fl. Toranomon Denki BLDG, 2-8-1 Minakoku, Tokyo, Japan
 KEPCO Hanoi Office - 1112, Charm Vit Tower, 117 Tran Duy Hung, Cau Giay, Hanoi, Vietnam
 KEPCO Johannesburg Office - 18th floor, Sandton City Tower Corner Rivonia Road & 5th St. Sandton P.O. Box 786703, Sandton City 2146, South Africa
 KEPCO London Office - 36 Old Jewry, London EC2R 8DD, UK
 KEPCO Iran Office - 6th floor Armaghan Tower, No. 13, Eastern Armaghan St., Africa Ave, Tehran, Iran
 KEPCO Dominican Republic Office - ESD Building, No. 63, Mario Garcia Alvarado St., Ens. Quisqueya, Santo Domingo, Dominican Republic

Operations

Domestic activities 
In Korea, KEPCO primarily provides electricity to include industrial, commercial, residential, educational and agricultural customers. As of December 31, 2011, KEPCO had a total installed generating capacity of 67,001MW produced by 503 generation units including nuclear, oil, coal, liquified natural gas, hydro, wind and solar sources. The length of KEPCO's transmission lines stood at 31,249 circuit kilometers as of end-2011.

Nuclear business 

KEPCO's involvement in the nuclear energy sector ranges from design and engineering of the nuclear power plant to nuclear fuel, commissioning and operation, maintenance and decommissioning. Construction of KEPCO nuclear power plants is undertaken by major Korean construction companies, while the manufacture of key elements of a nuclear power plant is done by companies including Doosan Heavy Industries & Construction and Westinghouse Electric Company. In 2009, KEPCO won a bid to construct four units of the APR-1400 reactor in the United Arab Emirates at Barakah.

In October 2013 a vice-president of KEPCO, amongst about 100 people, was indicted for falsifying safety documents.

In 2017 KEPCO showed interest in taking a stake in the Moorside Nuclear Power Station in the UK, though did not proceed with the project.

In October 2020 KEPCO signed a memorandum of understanding with Daewoo Shipbuilding & Marine Engineering to develop a floating nuclear power plant based on the BANDI-60 60 MWe small modular reactor, which has been under development since 2016.

Overseas activities 

KEPCO's overseas forays started in 1993 when the company was awarded a technical consulting contract for maintenance on the Guangdong nuclear power plant in China. At present, KEPCO is involved in projects in 13 countries around the world. In 1996, KEPCO entered the Philippines power market when it was awarded the contract for the refurbishment and operation of the Malaya thermal power plant. In 1996, KEPCO won the bid to construct the Ilijan gas-fired combined cycle power plant, a 1,200MW build-operate-transfer project. Today, KEPCO operates four power plants in the Philippines, including the Naga Power Plant Complex and the Cebu Circulating Fluidized Bed Combustion Power Plant, while the company's operations account for 12% of the country's installed generation capacity.

In the area of transmission and distribution consultation, KEPCO has undertaken projects in Myanmar, Cambodia, Vietnam, Indonesia, Libya, Ukraine, Paraguay and Egypt. KEPCO entered the wind power industry in China with its involvement in the Gansu wind project, on which the first stage of construction began in 2007. KEPCO also holds an equity share in wind projects in Inner Mongolia and Riaoning, as well as in China's Shanxi Province. In 2010, a KEPCO-led consortium including Samsung C&T and Korean firm Techint was awarded a contract to build and operate the Norte II combined cycle gas power plant in the Mexican state of Chihuahua. In 2005, KEPCO began supplying electricity to the Kaesong Industrial Region in North Korea.

Resources development 
In order to raise its fuel self-sufficiency rate to 60% by 2020, in 2010, KEPCO acquired the Bylong Coal Mine in Australia from Anglo American PLC. Also in 2010, KEPCO bought a 20% stake in Bayan Resources in Indonesia, thus allowing the company to raise its coal self-sufficiency rate by 7 million tons annually from 2015. In 2009, KEPCO bought a 1.5% stake in Indonesia's Adaro Energy, thus securing 3 million tons of coal annually. Regarding uranium procurement, in 2009, KEPCO acquired a 17% share of Denison Mines Corp. in Canada, as well as a 10% stake in Areva SA's Imouraren uranium mine in Niger. In 2010, KEPCO signed an agreement with Areva to jointly develop uranium mines.

Smart grid 
In early 2010, KEPCO announced it would invest over US$7 billion in its smart grid business by 2030 to make electricity distribution more efficient and decrease Korea's greenhouse gas emissions. KEPCO is one of the 168 Korean and foreign companies taking part in the Jeju Smart Grid Demonstration Project, begun following the announcement of Korea's National Smart Grid Roadmap in 2009. In June 2011, it was announced that KEPCO would collaborate with IBM to build a Total Operations Center at the Jeju Smart Grid Test-Bed Demonstration Complex.

See also
Jang Young-sik, KEPCO president from May 1998–April 1999
Energy in South Korea
Nuclear power in South Korea
Smart grids in South Korea
Jeju Smart Grid Demonstration Project in Korea
Economy of South Korea
Environment of South Korea
Lists of public utilities

References

External links 
 

Electric power companies of South Korea
Conglomerate companies of South Korea
Energy companies established in 1961
Non-renewable resource companies established in 1961
Companies listed on the Korea Exchange
Companies listed on the New York Stock Exchange
Naju
Chaebol
South Korean companies established in 1961
Government-owned companies of South Korea